Huarong may refer to the following locations in China:

 Huarong County (华容县), Hunan
 Huarong District (华容区), Ezhou, Hubei
Huarong Town (华容镇), town in and seat of Huarong District

See also
 China Huarong Asset Management